Released on November 4, 1987, Just Say Yes is the first volume of Sire Records' Just Say Yes promotional CD sampler series. It contains "both hard-to-find numbers by the label's established artists and tempting introductions to its promising new artists."

Track listing
 Depeche Mode - Never Let Me Down Again [Split Mix]
 Echo & the Bunnymen - Lips Like Sugar [12" Mix]
 The Mighty Lemon Drops - Out of Hand [Extended Version]
 James - Ya-Ho
 The Smiths - Work Is a Four-Letter Word
 Figures on a Beach - No Stars
 The Wild Swans - Young Manhood
 Ice-T - Somebody Gotta Do It (Pimpin' Ain't Easy!) [Remix]
 The Ramones - I Wanna Live
 Replacements - Can't Hardly Wait
 Throwing Muses - A Feeling
 Aztec Camera - How Men Are
 The Casual Gods - Cherokee Chief
 Erasure - Hideaway [Little Louie Vega Mix]

It is volume one in the Just Say Yes series of promotional compilations, of which each title was a variation on the 'Just Say' theme:

 Just Say Yes Volume II: Just Say Yo (1988)
 Just Say Yes Volume III: Just Say Mao (1989)
 Just Say Yes Volume IV: Just Say Da (1990)
 Just Say Yes Volume V: Just Say Anything (1991)
 Just Say Yes Volume VI: Just Say Yesterday (1992)
 Just Say Yes Volume VII: Just Say Roe (1994)

References

1987 compilation albums
Alternative rock compilation albums
Sire Records compilation albums